M. L. Fredericks, nicknamed "Curley" (or "Curly"), was an American motorcycle racer.

Fredericks was born in Denver, Colorado. In 1921, he became the American Motorcycle Association's Class A (stock) champion, riding for Indian.

On August 21, 1926, riding an Indian Altoona racing bike at Rockingham Park in Salem, New Hampshire, Fredricks turned a  lap in 37.4 seconds. The record still stands.

Fredericks was also 1928 AMA National Champion, on a  Indian. His victory on 4 August 1928 would be the last ever recorded on a board track.

Fredericks was inducted into the AMA Hall of Fame in 1998.

Notes

Sources 
AMA Hall of Fame Museum
Harley-Davidson online
Pioneers of American Motorcycle Racing (Daniel K. Statnekov website)

American motorcycle racers
American racing drivers
People from Denver
Racing drivers from Colorado
Racing drivers from Denver
Sportspeople from Denver
Year of birth missing
Year of death missing